Law College, Dehradun (popularly known as LCD) is one of the prestigious law school located in the city of Dehradun in north India state of Uttarakhand. It is the first independent law college in Uttarakhand. As a part of the faculty of Uttaranchal University, it has been accredited with Grade A+ by NAAC.

Academics
It offers a three-year LLB program, five-year BA LLB, BBA LLB programs, an LLM program and Doctoral program in Law.

Societies
The co-curricular component of academics is supplemented by a variety of activities organised by the College and University for law students through various Student Bodies. The organisation and execution of various events is delegated to the students.

Law College Dehradun/Department of Law:
 Legal Aid Centre (LAC)
 Alternative Dispute Resolution Center (ADRC)
 Moot Court Society (MCS)
 Debating Society (DEBSOC)
 Youth Parliament Society (YPS)
 Vasundhara – The Green Society
 Cultural Society
 Sports Society

See also
List of law schools in India

References

External links

{{Law College In Dehradun}}

Law schools in Uttarakhand
Educational institutions established in 2002
2002 establishments in Uttarakhand
Universities and colleges in Dehradun